Alina, the Turkish Assassin is a 2012 action film written by Seda Eğridere and directed by Vladimir Jedlicka. The consulting producer for the film was the famous American director Bobby Roth. It stars Seda Eğridere and Tamer Karadağlı.

Plot 
Alina tells story of Melisa Eryılmaz, a double agent named Alina, and her fight to discover the truth about her family and her real identity. Alina was adopted by the Turkish secret service agent Fırat Yılmaz at the age of 3 and was raised under the name Melisa Eryilmaz. Melisa learned Russian, Bulgarian, German, Arabic and English as a result of the trips she took as a kid with Firat Yilmaz and eventually started to work with intelligence agencies such as MI-6, CSR, CESIS, BND, SGDN and SAVAK. What she would discover on one assignment would shatter everything she knows about her life and would set her on a dangerous mission to discover the truth behind her real identity.

Cast 
 Tamer Karadağlı
 Seda Eğridere

Production 
Production began early 2010 and after a long search, Seda Eğridere was cast as the title character Alina in the feature film. Consulting director/producer for the film was the acclaimed American director Bobby Roth. Upon being cast as the titular character, Eğridere persuaded director Bobby Roth to shoot parts of the film in her home country. In an interview with one of the top newspapers in Turkey, Hurriyet, Bobby Roth praised Eğridere's acting performance and work discipline and noted that "I accepted the project and agreed to shoot in Turkey only because I trusted Seda." The casting process for the male lead actor was diligent and producers had difficulty finding a Turkish actor who spoke good English but finally, in 2012, Tamer Karadağlı was cast from a large pool of acclaimed Turkish celebrities to play the male lead opposite Eğridere. For the movie, Egridere was required to speak Russian, Spanish and Arabic, undergo extensive martial arts training and learn to ride a motorcycle to play the title role of Alina. She was celebrated for her physical performance and the sex scenes with Tamer Karadağlı generated a lot of buzz around the film.

References

External links 
 

2012 films
2010s English-language films
English-language Turkish films
2010s Turkish-language films
2012 action films
Turkish action films
Turkish films about revenge
2012 multilingual films
Turkish multilingual films